Noctuides albifascia is a species of snout moth in the genus Noctuides. It is known from Vietnam.

References

Moths described in 1930
Epipaschiinae